Sa Aking Mga Kamay (English: In My Own Hands) is a 1996 Philippine psychological thriller action drama film directed by Rory B. Quintos and produced by executive producers Charo Santos-Concio and Lily Y. Monteverde; producer Malou N. Santos; and supervising producers Trina N. Dayrit and Jackie Y. Liu. It stars Christopher de Leon as the NBI agent and Aga Muhlach as the psychopathic serial killer whom the former assigned to find him and kill him. It also stars Chin Chin Gutierrez, Kier Legaspi, Robert Arevalo, Amy Austria, and Karl Angelo Legaspi.

The story was written by ABS-CBN's resident writer-director Olivia M. Lamasan and adapted into a screenplay by Ricky Lee, Mel Mendoza-Del Rosario, and Benjou Elgincolin. The photography and editing of the film were done by Romy Vitug and Jess Navarro, respectively. Sa Aking Mga Kamay was released by Star Cinema on March 7, 1996 and it was digitally restored and remastered by ABS-CBN Film Restoration and Central Digital Lab in 2017.

Plot
With a massive number of reports of Gene Rivera, known by the organization as "The Cattleya Killer", killing numerous young women, Joven Dela Rosa, an agent from the National Bureau of Investigation, examines and solves the cases of the murders that the serial killer committed. His time solving the cases made his wife dismayed as they never had time together as husband-and-wife. One day, Camille befriends Gene, who at the same time stalked her, in the school of her and Joven's son Benjie. Later on, Joven meets Gene, and the latter plans to kill Camille. Things get even worse when Camille learned the true side of Gene and she is going to be his next victim. Because of this, the fight begins as Joven's partner Dino needs to assist him to kill Gene but Joven decides that he will do it instead.

Cast

Main cast
 Christopher de Leon as Joven Dela Rosa: An agent of the NBI who was assigned to track the trail of the serial killer named Gene Rivera. He is married to Camille and they had a son, Benjie.
 Aga Muhlach as Gene Rivera: A psychopathic serial killer, known under the alias of the "Cattleya Killer". His motive is to make a relationship with young women and then, kill them afterward. Because of his notoriety as a serial killer, Joven was assigned to kill him.
 Stefano Mori as young Gene
 Chin Chin Gutierrez as Camille Dela Rosa: Joven's wife and mother to their son, Benjie. She is the latest victim of Gene's preying on beautiful and married women.
 Kier Legaspi as Dino: Joven's partner in the NBI.
 Amy Austria as Anne: One of Joven's workmates in the NBI office. She described Gene Rivera as a "psychopath".
 Robert Arevalo as Rolando Galvez
 Karl Angelo Legaspi as Benjie: Joven and Camille's son.
 Teresa Loyzaga as Sally

Other cast

 Tess Michelena as Carmen
 Rosemarie Gil as Camille's Mom
 Ramil Rodriguez as Camille's Dad
 Romeo Rivera as Boss of NBI
 Orestes Ojeda as Gene's Dad
 Tata Melendez as Gene's Mom
 Cris Michelena as Victim #2's husband
 Tracy B. Montelibano as Newscaster
 Manny Mendoza as Field Reporter
 Zaffy Alonzo, Shannen Torres, and Patricia Ann Bermudez as Victims
 Jon Santillan-Wong, Marcel Sagum, Albert Guia, Francis Danuelas, Arman Drigo, Stan Sambrano, Alzie Mascenon, Eric Laygo, and Wilson Santiago as NBI Agents
 Archie Adamos, Jhop Bahian, Manolo Quequing, Edgar Buenavides, Robert Camisik, Lito Paraiso, and Abel Lagmay as Goons
 Eddie Albert Ramos and Princess Ann Schuck as Hostaged Children
 Arnold Montes and Bobet Aniversario as Waiters
 Jaime Hizon and Raffy Garcia as Joven's Brothers-in-Law
 Imelda Trinidad and Jeanette Tan as Joven's Sisters-in-Law
 Vic Gabion and Noel Lazaro as Security Guards
 The Powerdance Group as Commercial Dancers
 Noel Sandoval, Jojo Lopez, Benny Bautista as Policeman, Nido De Jesus, and Jun Dada as Policemen
 Raul Agravante as Reportermille's son

Production
The film was given acknowledgment by the National Bureau of Investigation and Makati Medical Center.

Casting and shooting
Aga Muhlach, playing the role of Gene Rivera, stated that his role is a challenge for him because he would play a serial killer rather than his usual typecast as the leading man on romantic drama films. During the film's shooting days, he admitted that he is not prepared to face Christopher de Leon, who played the role of Joven Dela Rosa, an agent from the NBI who was assigned to find Gene and kill him.

Christopher de Leon also admitted about the film. Even though he said that it is a very interesting role, the references to the NBI made him feel anxious and worried but this experience in the criminal investigation field during the shoot allowed him to shape his character.

Reception

Critical reception
Jay Cruz of Sinegang PH gave the film 4 out of 5 stars and praises Ricky Lee's writing, Rory Quintos' direction, and the respective acting performances of Aga Muhlach and Christopher de Leon. DJ Ramones of Reverse Delay gave a positive review, praising the film's written story by Olivia Lamasan and screenplay by Mel Mendoza-Del Rosario, Ricky Lee, and Benjou Elgincolin; Romeo Vitug's photography that has similarity to the 1991 film Hihintayin Kita sa Langit; and the characters portrayed in the film.

Accolades

Television remake
In 2021, ABS-CBN remade the film into a television series for international audiences titled The Rebirth of the Cattleya Killer. The upcoming series will be directed by Dan Villegas, written by Dodo Dayao, and produced by its executive producer Ruel S. Bayani. Arjo Atayde will play the role of Gene Rivera and Christopher de Leon, the actor in the original film, will reprise the role of Joven Dela Rosa. It would also star Jake Cuenca, Zsa Zsa Padilla, Ricky Davao, Nonie Buencamino, Frances Makil, Ketchup Eusebio, Jojit Lorenzo, Rafa Siguion-Reyna and Jane Oineza in the project.

References

Notes

External links
 

1996 films
Films directed by Rory Quintos